Debra Charlotte Morgan (spelled Deborah in the novels) is a fictional character created by Jeff Lindsay for his Dexter book series. She also appears in the television series, based on Lindsay's books, portrayed by Jennifer Carpenter. In Lindsay's novels, she first appeared in Darkly Dreaming Dexter and was featured in every novel in the series. Debra is the sister of the series' antihero protagonist Dexter Morgan.

Character history

Early life
Debra was born to Doris (Kathrin Lautner Middleton) and Harry Morgan (James Remar) on December 7, 1979. She is the foster sister to Dexter Morgan (Michael C. Hall), whom Harry brought home after rescuing him from the scene of his mother's murder. Tough, foul-mouthed, and rompish, she craved her father's attention and envied Dexter for the amount of time Harry spent with him, unaware that Harry was training him to be a vigilante serial killer.

When Debra was a teenager, her mother died of cancer. From then on, she decided to become a homicide detective, like her father, and took Harry's gun to practice shooting. Dexter found out and told Harry, who punished her. Hurt, Debra told Dexter that she wished that Harry had never brought him home. She was immediately remorseful for saying it, however, and apologized.

Debra was devastated when Harry died of an apparently accidental overdose of heart medication - unaware that he in fact committed suicide, unable to live with having trained Dexter to get away with murder. Soon afterward, she joined the Miami-Metro Police Department, where he had worked. She spent three years in patrol and then another two years in vice before being promoted by Captain Tom Matthews (Geoff Pierson) (a friend of her father), becoming a Homicide officer at the start of the first season.

Debra is characterized as smart and capable, yet unsure of herself, and so she relies upon Dexter's seemingly limitless expertise on murderers to solve difficult cases. Initially assigned to Vice, she is desperate to be transferred to Homicide. After Matthews promotes her, she starts to grow self-confident, relying less on Dexter's abilities and more on her own.

Season one
Newly promoted to the homicide department, Debra's first case is a series of murders committed by "The Ice Truck Killer", who preys on prostitutes and leaves their dismembered bodies in refrigerated trucks. She works hard on the case, but her progress is hampered by her own insecurity and her antagonistic relationship with her commanding officer, Lieutenant Maria LaGuerta (Lauren Vélez).

She starts dating, and eventually falls in love with, Rudy Cooper (Christian Camargo); unbeknownst to her, he is actually the Ice Truck Killer, and is only dating her in order to get close to Dexter. At the end of the season, Rudy proposes to her and she accepts. Rudy — who is actually Brian Moser, Dexter's biological brother — then kidnaps her to reveal himself to Dexter. He binds her to a table in the same manner that Dexter kills his victims, while Dexter and Brian discuss her fate. Dexter ultimately saves her life, and reluctantly kills Brian to keep her safe.

Season two
Debra is frail at the start of season two, still recovering from her ordeal with the Ice Truck Killer; she feels that she is not a good detective because she didn't spot that her fiancé was a serial killer. However, FBI agent Frank Lundy (Keith Carradine) reassures her otherwise and they, mid-season, develop a romantic relationship, which ends when he is called away from Miami. She stays in Dexter's house while she deals with the trauma.

Debra is appalled when she finds out that Dexter is cheating on his girlfriend, Rita Bennett (Julie Benz), with his Narcotics Anonymous sponsor, Lila Tournay (Jaime Murray), of whom she is immediately suspicious. Debra eventually threatens to have Lila deported upon finding out that she murdered her ex-boyfriend. In the season finale, "The British Invasion", she helps Dexter rescue Rita's two children from a fire that Lila had started.

By the end of the season, she has regained her confidence, and she is more determined than ever to improve her career and get a detective shield.

Season three
As season three begins, Debra has had her hair cut to shoulder length, and has "sworn off men, liquor and smokes". She is working with a new partner, Detective Joey Quinn (Desmond Harrington), but has been approached by Internal Affairs officer Yuki Amado (Liza Lapira), who tells her that her partner is being investigated for corruption. She refuses to assist in the investigation, however.

She is originally part of the team investigating the murder of Miguel Prado's (Jimmy Smits) brother Oscar (Nick Hermz), but because of her lack of tact and people skills she is removed from the case by the newly promoted Angel Batista (David Zayas). The case she has been assigned to, the murder of a young woman, is eventually found to have been connected to the ongoing case of a serial killer called "The Skinner" (Jesse Borrego), which she solves with the help of confidential informant Anton Briggs (David Ramsey). The two begin a relationship after she saves his life. Because of her success on the Skinner case, Debra receives her detective shield at the end of the season. She also serves as Dexter's best man at his and Rita's wedding.

Season four
At the beginning of the season, Dexter tells Debra that Harry slept with one of his confidential informants. She investigates the files on Harry's informants and interviews them, hoping to find the one Harry slept with. One of the files is shown to be Laura Moser (Sage Kirkpatrick). Her relationship with Anton begins to suffer at this point, especially when Lundy returns to Miami to hunt the Trinity Killer (John Lithgow). They sleep together and renew their relationship, but the very same night they are both shot — Lundy fatally — by an unknown assailant. Debra blames herself, and laments to Dexter that she is "broken". She puts aside her grief when she comes to suspect that the Trinity Killer was the shooter, and opens an investigation.

After consulting with forensics technician Vince Masuka (C. S. Lee), however, Debra deduces that Trinity could not have been the shooter. During a Thanksgiving dinner with Dexter's family, Debra remembers a conversation she had with reporter Christine Hill (Courtney Ford), and realizes Hill has knowledge of the shooting that no one outside the police department knew about, and concludes that she was the shooter. This is proven true in a later episode revealing that Hill is Trinity's daughter. Hill confesses to Debra that she killed Lundy, moments before she commits suicide. Debra then renews her search for Harry's mistress, and finds out about Laura Moser, and the fact that Dexter and the Ice Truck Killer are brothers. She tells Dexter the news (which he already knew), and then tells him that he is "the one consistently good thing" in her life.

Season five
Debra begins an intimate relationship with Quinn while trying to support Dexter following Rita's murder (portrayed in the season four finale, "The Getaway"). She and Quinn are assigned to the "Barrel Girls" case, in which 13 women were raped, tortured and murdered by a group of men, and left in barrels in a swamp. The police find DVDs the killers recorded of the crimes, and Debra is assigned to study them. She figures out that Jordan Chase (Jonny Lee Miller), a prominent public speaker, is involved with the group of men killing the girls, but cannot prove her suspicion because he never appears on the DVDs. However, she is able to track him down by the end of the season, and finds his body, moments after Dexter and Lumen Pierce (Julia Stiles) - one of the Barrel Girl killers' surviving victims and Dexter's lover and "protégé"- have killed him. She sees them at the crime scene through a wall of plastic sheeting, and tells them that she needs to call in the crime scene. She gives them an hour head start because she sympathizes with Lumen, but she never finds out that Dexter was involved.

In the middle of the season, Debra finds out that Quinn, who believes that Dexter was involved in Rita's murder, has been investigating Dexter behind her back. Debra is very upset at Quinn and confronts him. Quinn decides that his relationship with Debra is more important than his (supposedly) unfounded suspicions about Dexter, and stops his investigation. At the end of the season, they have reconciled, and attend Dexter's son Harrison's birthday party together.

Season six
At the start of the season, Quinn proposes to Debra, but she rejects him and ends their relationship. The ensuing awkwardness is made worse when she is promoted to Lieutenant, thanks in part to LaGuerta's political machinations. Debra earns the respect of the office, but struggles with the idea of some people not feeling 'open' to her anymore because of her new job. The job is also very stressful in itself, and she comes to doubt whether she can handle the responsibility. Her work and personal troubles weighing down on her, she begins to attend therapy. Matthews attempts to make a deal with her about covering up his involvement in the death of a prostitute, but before she can take any action, LaGuerta tells Matthews' superiors about his indiscretion and lets Debra take the fall for it. At the end of the season, her therapist helps her realize that she has been in love with Dexter all along. She finally makes peace with the idea — on the same day that she catches Dexter in the act of murdering "Doomsday Killer" Travis Marshall (Colin Hanks).

Season seven
In the season premiere, Debra witnesses Dexter murder Travis Marshall. Dexter claims that he went to collect evidence, and was surprised by Marshall; he then says that he "snapped" and killed him on impulse. Debra reluctantly helps him burn down the abandoned church where he killed Marshall, destroying the evidence of the crime. Later, Dexter comes home to Debra, who is surrounded by Dexter's victim's blood slides, a pack of knives, and other tools that Dexter uses to kill. Debra reluctantly asks Dexter if he is a serial killer. Dexter, taken aback, replies that he is. Horrified, Debra recoils from Dexter as he admits that he is the "Bay Harbor Butcher", and that Harry taught him how to get away with murder.

After reading Lundy's files on serial killers, Debra says she wants to help Dexter, and make sure he doesn't kill again. Dexter agrees, even though he doesn't really have a choice, as Debra (probably) would have arrested him. Dexter slips away from Debra long enough to dispose of Ray Speltzer (Matt Gerald), a serial killer she had tried and failed to send to prison. Debra admits that she understands why Dexter takes the law into his own hands, and tells him that she will not stop him as long as he does not tell her about it or interfere with Miami Metro investigations. She even compromises her own professional ethics by falsifying evidence to mislead LaGuerta, who is trying to reopen the Bay Harbor Butcher case.

Their truce is threatened when Dexter begins dating Hannah McKay (Yvonne Strahovski), a serial poisoner whom Debra is intent on arresting for the murder of Sal Price (Santiago Cabrera), a writer she had feelings for. Debra eventually confesses her feelings for Dexter in a moment of frustration. Debra gets into a near-fatal car accident after a confrontation with Hannah. She is convinced Hannah poisoned her, and Dexter is suspicious enough to order a toxicology screen on a bottle of water in Debra's car. The results prove that Hannah did indeed poison Debra, leaving Dexter no choice but to give Debra evidence proving that Hannah killed Price. Debra is on hand to arrest Hannah, as a heartbroken Dexter looks on.

In the season finale, Debra rushes to Dexter's side when LaGuerta has him arrested for the Bay Harbor Butcher murders, and angrily confronts LaGuerta before being told to recuse herself. Dexter is released, however, thanks to the evidence that Debra tampered with. The next day, LaGuerta calls her into her office under the pretext of apologizing — and confronts her with circumstantial evidence that she was near the church at the time it was destroyed. Debra talks her way out of immediate danger, but fears that LaGuerta will soon have definitive proof of what she and Dexter had done. Later, at Batista's New Year's Eve party, she learns that LaGuerta has gone in pursuit of Dexter, who she fears is in the act of killing Hector Estrada (Nestor Serrano), the man who ordered his mother's murder. She goes to the scene, where she finds Dexter poised to shoot an unconscious LaGuerta. As she pleads with Dexter not to do it, LaGuerta regains consciousness and urges Debra to kill her brother. Resigned, Dexter tells Debra to "do what you gotta do". Desperate to save Dexter, Debra shoots and kills LaGuerta, and breaks down in tears over her body.

Season eight
Six months after LaGuerta's death, Debra's life has gone into a tailspin: She has quit her job, started drinking heavily, and cut off all contact with Dexter. Now working as a private investigator, she is chasing after — and sleeping with — drug dealer Andrew Briggs (Rhys Coiro). Dexter shows up at her hotel and tells her that an assassin named El Sapo (Nick Gomez) is coming to kill her and Briggs; Debra responds that she doesn't care. When Briggs tries to scare Dexter off, Dexter kills him, and pleads with Debra to leave with him. Debra refuses, however. El Sapo finds Debra as she searches for Briggs' stolen merchandise and beats her up. In a state of shock, she shoots him dead. When Dexter finds out what Debra has done, she asks him to cover up the crime, which he does.

Debra is arrested for drunk driving, and calls Quinn to bail her out. Quinn tells Dexter what happened, and Dexter insists on taking Debra to dinner to talk to her. At dinner, he shows Debra footage of her saving a man's life and tells her that she is still a good person. A few days later, Debra walks into Miami Metro, blind drunk, and confesses to Quinn that she killed LaGuerta. Thinking she doesn't know what she's saying, Quinn calls Dexter for help. Dexter arrives with Dr. Evelyn Vogel (Charlotte Rampling), an old friend of Harry's who knows that Dexter is a serial killer. Just as Debra is about to tell Quinn the truth about LaGuerta's death, Dexter renders her unconscious with the same tranquilizer he uses on his victims, and takes her back to his apartment. There, he asks Vogel to help her.

Vogel tells Debra that she had no other choice but to protect Dexter, and shows her recorded interviews with Harry expressing his guilt over training Dexter to kill; in these interviews, Debra learns the truth about her father's death. She reaches out to Dexter, asking him to take a drive with her so they can talk. Once on the road, Debra seizes the steering wheel and plunges the car into the bay, intent on killing herself and her brother. She is rescued, however, and saves Dexter's life by swimming to the car and pulling him out. Debra goes to a resentful Dexter for help when Vogel is kidnapped. While the two of them track Vogel down, Debra tells Dexter that she had saved his life because she couldn't imagine hers without him in it. They find Vogel at the mercy of one of her former patients, serial killer A.J. Yates (Aaron McCusker); Dexter kills him to protect Debra. Dexter and Debra admit they need each other, and they reconcile.

Debra and Dexter are both non-lethally poisoned by Hannah, who has escaped from prison. Debra demands that Dexter get her out of their lives, and starts surveilling her. When Dexter appears reluctant, Debra goes to her boss Jacob Elway (Sean Patrick Flanery) and offers to apprehend Hannah for a substantial reward. She tries to capture Hannah, who says the only reason she spared her life was because she didn't want to hurt Dexter. Debra reluctantly drops the case, and even allows Hannah to hide from the police in her apartment.

Debra stops by her old precinct, and Batista offers to reinstate her as a detective. She wants the job, but she knows that she cannot do it while harboring a fugitive and turning a blind eye to Dexter's crimes. To further complicate the situation, she and Quinn, who is now in a relationship with Batista's sister Jamie (Aimee Garcia), share a kiss. Dexter tells her that he, Hannah and Harrison are going to move to Argentina. Debra is saddened, but gives him her blessing when she sees how happy he is with his new family. The following day, she takes the job at Miami Metro, and renews her relationship with Quinn.

In her first case, Debra helps Dexter catch Oliver Saxon (Darri Ingolfson), a serial killer known as "the Brain Surgeon". Dexter ultimately decides not to kill him, however, and asks her to arrest Saxon. Debra arrives just as Saxon is killing Deputy U.S. Marshall Cooper (Kenny Johnson) and draws her weapon. However, Saxon gets the drop on her and shoots her in the abdomen. In the series' final episode, "Remember the Monsters?", Debra is taken to the hospital, where she tells Quinn she loves him and wishes Dexter a happy life. However, moments later, she suffers a massive stroke that leaves her in a persistent vegetative state. After killing Saxon, Dexter goes to see her in the hospital as it is being evacuated in the midst of a hurricane. He tearfully removes her life support as an act of mercy, carries her body to his boat and buries her at sea.

Dexter: New Blood
In the revival series, Dexter: New Blood, Debra, while still dead, has replaced Harry in Dexter's mind as his "Dark Passenger". Unlike Harry, however, Debra gives Dexter - who has abstained from murder for nearly a decade - advice on how not to kill. When Dexter "falls off the wagon" by impulsively murdering Matt Caldwell (Steve M. Robertson), a stockbroker from a wealthy family who once got away with killing five people, she chastises him, but nevertheless advises him on the best way to destroy the evidence and lead his girlfriend, local police chief Angela Bishop (Julia Jones), to believe that Caldwell is still alive.

When a teenage Harrison (Jack Alcott) tracks him down, Debra pleads with Dexter to stay out of the boy's life, insisting that everyone who gets close to Dexter ends up dead. Dexter ultimately ignores her, however, and once again becomes a father to the boy. Debra helps Dexter realize that Harrison has a "Dark Passenger" of his own, and pleads with her brother not to teach Harrison to kill the same way Harry did. Eventually, however, Dexter decides to teach Harrison the "Code of Harry", and the two of them kill Caldwell's father Kurt (Clancy Brown), a serial killer who has been preying on teenage girls for 25 years.

In the series finale, "Sins of the Father", Debra berates Dexter for getting caught after Angela arrests him for Caldwell's murder, and ridicules the idea that he and Harrison could be "father and son" serial killers. Later, after Harrison shoots and mortally wounds Dexter, Debra holds her brother's hand as he dies.

Romantic relationships
Debra is known to have very bad relationships with men. Her first boyfriend on the series is a mechanic named Sean who turns out to be married. She then has a relationship with Rudy Cooper, who ends up kidnapping her and trying to kill her twice.

In Season two, she starts going out with a man named Gabriel whom she met at the gym, and whom she suspects (incorrectly) of trying to use her notoriety following the Ice Truck Killer case to jumpstart his writing career. After that ends, she goes out with Frank Lundy, a man 25 years her senior who has to leave Miami at the end of season two, although she resumes her relationship with him in season four. She then starts a relationship with her Confidential Informant Anton Briggs. She breaks up with him to resume her relationship with Lundy, who is murdered. In the season five premiere she sleeps with her partner, Joey Quinn, who tries unsuccessfully to move the relationship into something more than purely sexual. By the end of season 6, she comes to believe that she is in love with her adoptive brother, Dexter — only to find out that he is a serial killer. In season 7, she has feelings for true crime writer Sal Price, but he is murdered as well. At the end of season 8, Debra and Joey rekindle their relationship before she ultimately dies.

Differences from the novels
In the books, the character's name is spelled "Deborah", and she is described as "voluptuous" in contrast to her slim appearance on the TV show. In the novel Darkly Dreaming Dexter, Deborah finds out that Dexter is a serial killer, and appears to accept it, although she is sometimes torn between her love for her brother and her duty as a cop. In the TV series, Debra remains unaware of Dexter's "hobby" until the final episode of season six, when she witnesses Dexter killing Travis Marshall.

At the conclusion of Dexter is Delicious, Deborah is pregnant by her boyfriend, Kyle Chutsky, and in Double Dexter we learn that she gave birth to a son, Nicholas, and raises him alone.

In Dexter's Final Cut, Deborah disowns Dexter after he cheats on Rita and unintentionally allows pedophile Robert Chase to kill Rita and kidnap Astor. In Dexter is Dead, Deborah takes custody of Cody, Astor, and Dexter's daughter Lily Ann after Dexter is imprisoned for Rita's murder; she knows that Dexter is innocent of that particular crime, but believes that he belongs in prison. After Dexter is freed thanks to his brother Brian's machinations, she refuses to let him see the children and communicates with him only to get him to sign the paperwork to finalize the adoption. However, she is forced to rely on him when Cody, Astor and Nicholas are kidnapped by a Mexican drug lord who is out to get Brian. The three of them team up to infiltrate the drug lord's yacht and rescue the children, and Deborah and Dexter repair their relationship. Deborah saves Dexter's life by killing the drug lord just as he has her wounded brother at his mercy. Moments later, however, Dexter is seemingly killed when the yacht explodes; in the final moments of the novel, he sees Deborah trying to save him.

Reception
Jennifer Carpenter's portrayal of Debra Morgan has received critical praise. Australian journalist Jack Marx describing her portrayal of "cool and clumsy" Debra as "so perfect that many viewers appear to have mistaken the character's flaws for the actor's."

For her portrayal of the character, she has been nominated for seven Saturn Awards for Best Supporting Actress on Television, in 2007, 2008, 2010, 2011, 2012, and 2013, winning in 2009 for her performance in season three. She has also been nominated four times as part of the ensemble cast for the Screen Actors Guild Award for Outstanding Performance by an Ensemble in a Drama Series in 2009, 2010, 2011, and 2012.

References

External links

Dexter (series) characters
Television characters introduced in 2004
Fictional characters from Miami
Fictional police lieutenants
Characters in American novels of the 21st century
Fictional cannabis users
Fictional cocaine users
Police misconduct in fiction
Fictional murderers
Fictional private investigators
Fictional alcohol abusers
Sororicide in fiction
Fictional Miami-Dade Police Department detectives
Fictional attempted suicides
American female characters in television
Female characters in television
Fictional characters with post-traumatic stress disorder